Reseda may refer to:

In natural science
Reseda (plant), a plant genus also known as mignonette
1081 Reseda, a minor planet that orbits the Sun; named for the Reseda plant genus

Places
Reseda, Los Angeles, a neighborhood in the San Fernando Valley of Southern California
Reseda Boulevard, a north–south street in western San Fernando Valley; passes through the Reseda neighborhood
Reseda (Los Angeles Metro station), a station on the Orange Line of the LACMTA rail transportation system; named for Reseda Boulevard
Reseda Theater, the cinema prominently featured in the opening shots of the film Boogie Nights (1997) that fixes the scene's location

Colours
Reseda green, a shade of greyish green